Trent is a town in Taylor County, Texas, United States that was established in 1881. The population was 337 at the 2010 census. It is part of the Abilene, Texas Metropolitan Statistical Area. Trent, Texas was named in honor of West Texas pioneer and cattleman, Isaac Riley Trent.

Geography

Trent is located at  (32.487508, –100.123639).

According to the United States Census Bureau, the town has a total area of 0.4 square miles (1.1 km), all land.

Demographics

2020 census

As of the 2020 United States census, there were 295 people, 78 households, and 48 families residing in the town.

2000 census
As of the census of 2000,  318 people, 130 households, and 86 families resided in the town. The population density was 775.7 people per square mile (299.5/km). The 150 housing units averaged 365.9 per square mile (141.3/km). The racial makeup of the town was 91.82% White, 2.83% African American, 1.57% Native American, 0.31% Asian, 2.52% from other races, and 0.94% from two or more races. Hispanics or Latinos of any race were 10.06% of the population.

Of the 130 households, 33.1% had children under the age of 18 living with them, 54.6% were married couples living together, 6.2% had a female householder with no husband present, and 33.8% were not families. About 29.2% of all households were made up of individuals, and 17.7% had someone living alone who was 65 years of age or older. The average household size was 2.45 and the average family size was 3.05.

In the town, the population was distributed as  25.5% under the age of 18, 8.5% from 18 to 24, 28.0% from 25 to 44, 20.4% from 45 to 64, and 17.6% who were 65 years of age or older. The median age was 38 years. For every 100 females, there were 86.0 males. For every 100 females age 18 and over, there were 91.1 males.

The median income for a household in the town was $40,156, and for a family was $41,591. Males had a median income of $30,417 versus $16,250 for females. The per capita income for the town was $16,878. About 7.4% of families and 9.2% of the population were below the poverty line, including 8.8% of those under age 18 and 6.1% of those age 65 or over.

Climate
This climate type occurs primarily on the periphery of the true deserts in low-latitude semiarid steppe regions.  The Köppen climate classification subtype for this climate is BSk (tropical and subtropical steppe climate).

References

Towns in Taylor County, Texas
Towns in Texas
Abilene metropolitan area